The Sunland Derby is an American Thoroughbred horse race held annually at Sunland Park Racetrack in Sunland Park, New Mexico. Inaugurated in 2003, the race is open to three-year-olds willing to race one and one-eighth miles on the dirt and is sponsored by WinStar Farm of Versailles, Kentucky. Held in March, the Sunland Derby currently offers a purse of $800,000.

In its 11th year in 2013, it received Grade III status from the American Graded Stakes Committee for the first time in 2010. It is listed as an official Kentucky Derby prep race.

The 2016 running of the Sunland Derby was cancelled due to an outbreak of Equine herpesvirus 1.

The 2020 running & 2021 running of the Sunland Derby was cancelled due to an outbreak of COVID-19.

Records
Speed  record:
 1:46.94 - Cutting Humor (2019) (at current distance of 9 furlongs)
 1:42.84 - Excessivepleasure (2003) (at former distance of 8.5 furlongs)

Most wins by a jockey:
 2 - Victor Espinoza (2006, 2007)
 2 - Martin Garcia (2013, 2014)

Most wins by a trainer:
 3 - Bob Baffert (2006, 2013, 2014)
 3 - Doug O'Neill (2003, 2005, 2022)

Most wins by an owner:
 2 - Michael E. Pegram (2006, 2013)

Winners

See also
Road to the Kentucky Derby

References

The 2009 Sunland Derby at the NTRA

2003 establishments in New Mexico
Horse races in New Mexico
Sunland Park Racetrack & Casino
Flat horse races for three-year-olds
Triple Crown Prep Races
Graded stakes races in the United States
Grade 3 stakes races in the United States
Recurring events established in 2003
Sports in New Mexico